The Hindu Temple of Delaware is a Hindu temple in Hockessin, Delaware. Inaugurated in 2002, it is the first Hindu temple constructed in Delaware. According to The News Journal, the temple has become "a social and cultural gathering place" for Indian Americans in New Castle County.

The temple's main deity is Lakshmi, the goddess of wealth and prosperity.

History 
In the late 20th century, Indian immigrant families in Delaware started gathering at local churches and schools to worship and celebrate Hindu festivals. As the local Indian American population grew, these families formed the Hindu Temple Association of Hockessin. The association conducted fundraisers to raise money to buy land to build a temple. After raising enough funds, the association purchased five acres of land. In 1996, construction began on the site. In 2002, the temple was inaugurated with the Kumbhabhishekham ceremony.

In 2020, a 25-foot statue of Hanuman, the god of courage and wisdom, was installed at the temple entrance. It is the tallest Hanuman statue in the United States and weighs 60,000 pounds.

Administration
The temple is administered by a board of trustees.

See also
 List of Hindu temples in the United States

References

Hindu temples in Delaware
Shakti temples
Buildings and structures in New Castle County, Delaware
2002 establishments in Delaware
Hinduism in the United States
Indian-American culture in Delaware
Asian-American culture in Delaware